Deca Sports Extreme  is a sports video game for the Nintendo 3DS which is developed by Hudson Soft and published by Konami in the Deca Sports series. The game was released across three regions, from April to September 2011 and is the third and final spin-off of the series, and by extension, its sixth and final overall game.

Reception

Deca Sports Extreme received mixed reviews from critics. On Metacritic, the game holds a score of 52/100 based on 6 reviews. Common points of criticism for the game included the controls being cumbersome and overly sensitive, teammate and opponent AI being either too dumb or too aggressive, and the camera not being able to track the action properly.

Marko Djordjević of GameSpot gave the game a 3.5/10 while calling it out for feeling "sloppy" and how it "fails to bring anything interesting to the experience". Zach Kaplan of Nintendo Life, giving the game 5 out of 10 stars, praised the game's multiplayer mode but ultimately called it an "average and unmemorable compilation".

Notes

 Known in Japan as

References

2011 video games
Nintendo 3DS games
Nintendo 3DS-only games
Minigame compilations
Hudson Soft games
Multiplayer and single-player video games
Video game spin-offs
Video games developed in Japan